Palitana railway station  is a railway station serving in Bhavnagar district of Gujarat State of India. It is under Bhavnagar railway division of Western Railway Zone of Indian Railways. Four passenger and one Superfast trains start from here.

Trains 

The following train terminates at Palitana railway station:

 22935/36 Bandra Terminus–Palitana Express

Another 04 Passenger train running between Palitana - Bhavnagar Terminus Route Before the Covid-19 Pandemic.

Currently Running 1 Covid 19 Special train between Palitana and Bhavnagar terminus.
And Palitana = Bandra Terminus SF Express.

See also
Bhavnagar State Railway

References

Railway stations in Bhavnagar district
Bhavnagar railway division